Robert Bell  (6 January 1845 – 21 January 1926) was an English physician who specialised in gynaecology and oncology and was vice-president of the International Cancer Research Society. He was also a naturopath and medical writer who published several books on cancer and other diseases. Bell was an advocate for alternative cancer treatments, including vegetarianism. His promotion of such treatments led to the oncologist Ernest Francis Bashford accusing him of quackery in the British Medical Journal; Bell successfully sued Bashford and the journal for libel.

Biography 
Bell was born in Alnwick, on 6 January 1845. He studied at the University of Glasgow and in Paris. Bell worked for 21 years at the Glasgow Samaritan Hospital for Women as senior physician.

Bell moved to London in 1904. In 1909, he declined an offer of a baronetcy. He was a council member of the Order of the Golden Age, and the vice president of the International Cancer Research Society. Bell advocated fasting and a diet of uncooked vegetables and fruit, along with eggs and dairy as an optimal diet for maintaining health.

Bell later led cancer research at Battersea Anti-Vivisection Hospital and worked to publicise his view that surgical treatment for cancer was unnecessary and that cancer was preventable by dietetic and hygienic measures. Bell recommended his cancer patients fresh air and a vegetarian diet of uncooked vegetables, nuts and dairy products. An article by the noted oncologist Ernest Francis Bashford published by the British Medical Journal, in 1911, accused Bell of quackery for his cancer treatments; he successfully sued the author and journal for libel and was awarded £2,000 damages plus costs.

In 1924, Bell published his autobiography, Reminiscences of an Old Physician. He died at the age of 81, on 21 January 1926.

Selected publications 
 Sterility (London: Churchill, 1896)
 The Pathogenesis and Treatment of Cancer Without Operation (Glasgow: R.L. Holmes, 1900)
 Ten Years' Record of the Treatment of Cancer Without Operation (London: Dean, 1906)
 Health at Its Best V. Cancer (Unwin, 1908)
 Cancer and Its Remedy (London: Medical Times Pub. Co., 1909)
 Reminiscences of an Old Physician (London: Murray, 1924)

Notes

References

External links 
 
 Works by Robert Bell at HathiTrust
 
 

1845 births
1926 deaths
19th-century English male writers
19th-century English medical doctors
20th-century English male writers
20th-century English medical doctors
Alumni of the University of Glasgow Medical School
Alternative cancer treatment advocates
Anti-vivisectionists
British vegetarianism activists
Cancer researchers
English autobiographers
English gynaecologists
English medical writers
English oncologists
Fasting advocates
Fellows of the Royal College of Physicians and Surgeons of Glasgow
Naturopaths
People associated with the Order of the Golden Age
Raw foodists